Historisk Tidsskrift is a Danish history journal established in 1840 with the founding of the Danish Historical Society in the same year. It is the oldest extant national journal for history.

History and profile
Historisk Tidsskrift was first published in 1840. The Danish Historical Association is the owner of the magazine.

The magazine is published in two fascicles each year. The first editor was Christian Molbech. Since 1973, it has always had two editors.

List of editors
1839–1853: Christian Molbech
1853–1865: Niels Ludvig Westergaard
1865–1878: Edvard Holm
1878–1897: Carl Frederik Bricka
1897–1912: Julius Albert Fridericia
1912–1917: Kristian Erslev
1917–1924: Erik Arup
1924–1932: Ellen Jørgensen
1932–1942: Axel Lindvald
1942–1965: Povl Bagge and Astrid Friis
1965–1973: Svend Ellehøj
1973–1982: Inga Floto and Erling Ladewig Petersen
1982–1988: Hans Kirchhoff
1982–1989: Esben Albrectsen
1988–2006: Carsten Due-Nielsen
1989–2003: Anders Monrad Møller
2004–present: Jan Pedersen
2006–present: Regin Schmidt

See also
List of magazines in Denmark

References

External links

tidsskrift.dk Portal of the Danish Royal Library with online version of Historisk Tidsskrift

1840 establishments in Denmark
Biannual magazines
Magazines published in Copenhagen
Danish-language magazines
History magazines
Historiography of Denmark
Magazines established in 1840